John Sherwood (1913 - 2002) was an author of fiction. He wrote the cozy Celia Grant Horticultural mystery series, amongst others.

Bibliography

Charles Blessington series
 Disappearance of Dr. Bruderstein (1949)
 Mr. Blessington's Imperialist Plot (1951)
 Ambush for Anatol (1952) (US title: Murder of a Mistress)
 Two Died in Singapore (1954)
 Vote Against Poison (1956)

Celia Grant series
 Green Trigger Fingers (1984)
 A Botanist at Bay (1985)
 The Mantrap Garden (1986)
 Flowers of Evil (1987)
 Menacing Groves (1988)
 A Bouquet of Thorns (1989)
 The Sunflower Plot (1990)
 The Hanging Garden (1992)
 Creeping Jenny (1993)
 Bones Gather No Moss (1994)
 Shady Borders (1996)

Other novels

 Undiplomatic Exit (1958); shortlisted for Gold Dagger Award
 Half Hunter (1961) (US title: The Sleuth and the Liar)
 Honesty Will Get You Nowhere (1977)
 The Limericks of Lachasse (1978)
 Hour of the Hyenas (1979)
 A Shot in the Arm (1982) (US title: Death at the BBC)

1913 births
2002 deaths
British crime fiction writers
20th-century British novelists